The  was a light bomber built by Kawasaki Kōkūki Kōgyō K.K. for the Imperial Japanese Army in the 1930s. It was the last biplane bomber design to be produced for the Imperial Japanese Army Air Force, and saw combat service in Manchukuo and in north China during the early stages of the Second Sino-Japanese War.

Design & Development
The Ki-3 was a biplane design of all-metal construction with light alloy and fabric covering, with staggered wings and a fixed, divided landing gear. It was powered by one supercharged  BMW IX V12 inline engine, driving a wooden two-bladed propeller. One 7.7 mm (.303 in) machine gun was mounted to fire forward, synchronized with the propeller, and another was mounted dorsally on a flexible mount. The two man crew sat in open cockpits.

KDA-6 and A-6
The Ki-3 originated as a private venture, launched by Kawasaki to develop a dedicated reconnaissance aircraft. The latter's prototype, designated KDA-6, was designed by the German engineer Dr. Richard Vogt, who was working in Japan at the time. Takeo Doi the future chief designer for Kawasaki, worked as Vogt's assistant on the project; Vogt later went on to become chief designer for Blohm & Voss. The KDA-6 was rejected by the IJA due to changes in the procurement process, despite having excellent performance and handling characteristics. Awarded the contract to build the Army Type 93 Single-engined Light Bomber, Kawasaki used their experience of the KDA-6 in their design for this new aircraft, which was given the Kitai number Ki-3.

A civilian version of the KDA-6, later designated Kawasaki A-6, was produced as a communications aircraft and was used successfully by the Asahi Shimbun newspaper for printing plate and personnel transport duties.

Operational history
The Kawasaki Ki-3 was designated "Army Type 93-1 Single-engine Light Bomber" under the other Japanese military aircraft nomenclature system. It flew in April 1933 and entered operational service initially with the 6th Composite Air Regiment in Chosen (Korea). It subsequently was used in combat in Manchukuo (Manchuria) and in north China during the initial stages of the Second Sino-Japanese War, where it could make use of its good maneuverability to support ground troops. It was considered a rugged ground-attack aircraft, but the supercharger of its liquid-cooled engine was a constant source of problems.

Variants
Ki-3 (Army Type 93-1 Single-engine Light Bomber). 243 built (3 prototypes, 200 by Kawasaki and 40 by Tachikawa Aircraft Company Ltd) from January 1934 till March 1935.

Operators

 Imperial Japanese Army Air Force

Specifications (Ki-3)

See also

References

Bibliography

Biplanes
Single-engined tractor aircraft
Ki-03, Kawasaki
Ki-003
Aircraft first flown in 1933